Acle railway station is on the Wherry Lines in the east of England, serving the town of Acle, Norfolk. Its three-letter station code is ACL.

History
Opened by the Great Eastern Railway in 1883, it became part of the London and North Eastern Railway following the Grouping of 1923. The line then passed on to the Eastern Region of British Railways upon nationalisation in 1948.

When sectorisation was introduced, the station was served by Regional Railways until the privatisation of British Railways.

Today the station is served by Greater Anglia, which operates the services between Norwich and Great Yarmouth. Until 2019, trains were formed by diesel multiple units of Classes 153, 156 or 170. During the summer months, some locomotive-hauled trains, top-and-tailed with a Class 37 at either end, would work certain services on the Wherry Lines. All services are now operated by the brand new Class 755 Stadler FLIRT electro-diesel multiple units.

The station has the only passing loop on the Acle branch of the line, and in times past there was a coaling depot.

Services
 the typical Monday-Saturday off-peak service at Acle is as follows:
1tph (train per hour) to 
1tph to 

Services are reduced to 1tp2h on Sundays.

References

 
 
 
 Station on navigable O.S. map

External links 

Railway stations in Norfolk
DfT Category F2 stations
Former Great Eastern Railway stations
Railway stations in Great Britain opened in 1883
Greater Anglia franchise railway stations
Acle